Marie-Louise Charles (1765, Petit-Bourg – after 1807) was a French businessperson.

Marie-Louise Charles was born as a slave in Guadeloupe. In 1784, she was freed and settled in Bordeaux in France, where she bought a house for the sum of 4000 livres, a colossal sum for a newly freed slave. Through financial deals and the rental of her property in Bordeaux she acquired a fortune and was able to live a life of luxury.  In 1790, she married the affranchi François Hardy.  Her life has been the subject of research and is considered to be remarkable and unusual for a former slave in the 18th century. While there was a large enclave of people of African descent and former slaves in Bordeaux, only a minority of them became rich, and most of them were male.  She is last noted in 1807, when she stated her profession as that of a seamstress and was apparently no longer wealthy.

References

1765 births
18th-century French businesspeople
French slaves
Guadeloupean women
People from Petit-Bourg
Year of death unknown
18th-century slaves
Free people of color
18th-century French businesswomen